Calamus is a genus of flowering plants in the palm family Arecaceae that are among several genera known as rattan palms. There are an estimated 400 species in this genus, all native to tropical and subtropical Asia, Africa, and Australia.

Description
They are dioecious, mostly leaf-climbing lianas with slender, reedy stems. To aid scrambling some species have evolved hooks on the underside of the midrib, or more commonly by modified "pinnae" or tendrils in the form of stout, backward-pointing spines. These stems may grow to lengths of 200 metres. 

The fruits of certain species, in particular Calamus draco, produce a red resin known as "Dragon's blood".

Species 
, Plants of the World Online recognises 415 species:

 Calamus acamptostachys (Becc.) W.J.Baker
 Calamus acanthochlamys J.Dransf.
 Calamus acanthophyllus Becc.
 Calamus acanthospathus Griff.
 Calamus acaulis A.J.Hend., N.K.Ban & N.Q.Dung
 Calamus adspersus Blume
 Calamus aidae Fernando
 Calamus albidus L.X.Guo & A.J.Hend.
 Calamus altiscandens Burret
 Calamus andamanicus Kurz
 Calamus anomalus Burret
 Calamus applanatus (A.J.Hend. & N.Q.Dung) A.J.Hend.
 Calamus arborescens Griff.
 Calamus aruensis Becc.
 Calamus arugda Becc.
 Calamus ashtonii J.Dransf.
 Calamus asperrimus Blume
 Calamus asteracanthus (Becc.) W.J.Baker
 Calamus ater (J.Dransf.) W.J.Baker
 Calamus australis Mart.
 Calamus axillaris Becc.
 Calamus bacularis Becc.
 Calamus badius J.Dransf. & W.J.Baker
 Calamus baiyerensis W.J.Baker & J.Dransf.
 Calamus balerensis Fernando
 Calamus balingensis Furtado
 Calamus banggiensis (J.Dransf.) W.J.Baker
 Calamus bankae W.J.Baker & J.Dransf.
 Calamus baratangensis Renuka & Vijayak.
 Calamus barbatus Zipp. ex Blume
 Calamus barfodii W.J.Baker & J.Dransf.
 Calamus barisanensis A.J.Hend.
 Calamus batanensis (Becc.) Baja-Lapis
 Calamus beccarii A.J.Hend.
 Calamus bicolor Becc.
 Calamus billitonensis Becc. ex K.Heyne
 Calamus bimanifer T.Evans, Sengdala, Viengkham, Thamm. & J.Dransf.
 Calamus boniensis Becc. ex K.Heyne
 Calamus bousigonii Pierre ex Becc.
 Calamus brandisii Becc.
 Calamus brevicaulis (A.J.Hend. & N.Q.Dung) W.J.Baker
 Calamus brevissimus A.J.Hend.
 Calamus brunneus A.J.Hend., Pitopang & Moh.Iqbal
 Calamus bulubabi W.J.Baker & J.Dransf.
 Calamus burckianus Becc.
 Calamus burkillianus Becc. ex Ridl.
 Calamus caesius Blume
 Calamus calapparius Mart.
 Calamus calciphilus A.J.Hend.
 Calamus calicarpus Griff.
 Calamus calospathus (Ridl.) W.J.Baker & J.Dransf.
 Calamus capillosus W.J.Baker & J.Dransf.
 Calamus carsicola Adorador & Fernando
 Calamus caryotoides A.Cunn. ex Mart.
 Calamus castaneus Griff.
 Calamus caurinus A.J.Hend. & Rustiami
 Calamus centralis A.J.Hend., N.K.Ban & N.Q.Dung
 Calamus ceratophorus Conrard
 Calamus cheirophyllus J.Dransf. & W.J.Baker
 Calamus ciliaris Blume
 Calamus cinereus A.J.Hend. & N.Q.Dung
 Calamus clivorum A.J.Hend. & N.Q.Dung
 Calamus cockburnii J.Dransf.
 Calamus compsostachys Burret
 Calamus comptus J.Dransf.
 Calamus concinnus Mart.
 Calamus concolor (Blume) W.J.Baker
 Calamus confusus (Furtado) W.J.Baker
 Calamus conirostris Becc.
 Calamus conjugatus Furtado
 Calamus conspectus W.J.Baker
 Calamus convallium J.Dransf.
 Calamus crassifolius J.Dransf.
 Calamus crinitus (Blume) Miq.
 Calamus cristatus (Becc.) W.J.Baker
 Calamus croftii J.Dransf. & W.J.Baker
 Calamus cumingianus Becc.
 Calamus cuthbertsonii Becc.
 Calamus dasyacanthus W.J.Baker, Bayton, J.Dransf. & Maturb.
 Calamus deerratus G.Mann & H.Wendl.
 Calamus delicatulus Thwaites
 Calamus densifloropsis A.J.Hend.
 Calamus densiflorus Becc.
 Calamus depauperatus Ridl.
 Calamus dianbaiensis C.F.Wei
 Calamus didymocarpus Warb. ex Becc.
 Calamus diepenhorstii Miq.
 Calamus digitatus Becc.
 Calamus dilaceratus Becc.
 Calamus dioicus Lour.
 Calamus discolor Mart.
 Calamus disjunctus A.J.Hend.
 Calamus distentus Burret
 Calamus divaricatus Becc.
 Calamus divergens A.J.Hend., Pitopang & Moh.Iqbal
 Calamus dongnaiensis Pierre ex Becc.
 Calamus dracunculus (Ridl.) W.J.Baker
 Calamus dumetosus (J.Dransf.) A.J.Hend. & Floda
 Calamus egregius Burret
 Calamus elegans Becc. ex Ridl.
 Calamus erectus Roxb.
 Calamus erinaceus (Becc.) Becc.
 Calamus erioacanthus Becc.
 Calamus erythrocarpus W.J.Baker & J.Dransf.
 Calamus essigii W.J.Baker
 Calamus eugenei W.J.Baker
 Calamus evansii A.J.Hend.
 Calamus exiguus A.J.Hend.
 Calamus exilis Griff.
 Calamus fertilis Becc.
 Calamus filipendulus Becc.
 Calamus filispadix Becc.
 Calamus fissilis A.J.Hend., N.K.Ban & N.Q.Dung
 Calamus flabellatus Becc.
 Calamus flagellum Griff. ex Walp.
 Calamus floribundus Griff.
 Calamus formicarius (Becc.) W.J.Baker
 Calamus formosanus Becc.
 Calamus furvus A.J.Hend.
 Calamus gaharuensis A.J.Hend.
 Calamus gajoensis A.J.Hend. & Rustiami
 Calamus gamblei Becc.
 Calamus geniculatus Griff.
 Calamus gibbsianus Becc.
 Calamus glaucescens (Blume) D.Dietr.
 Calamus godefroyi Becc.
 Calamus gonospermus Becc.
 Calamus goramensis A.J.Hend.
 Calamus gracilipes Miq.
 Calamus gracilis Roxb.
 Calamus griseus J.Dransf.
 Calamus guruba Buch.-Ham. ex Mart.
 Calamus hallierianus (Becc. ex K.Heyne) W.J.Baker
 Calamus harmandii Pierre ex Becc.
 Calamus heatubunii W.J.Baker & J.Dransf.
 Calamus helferianus Kurz
 Calamus henryanus Becc.
 Calamus heteracanthopsis A.J.Hend.
 Calamus heteracanthus Zipp. ex Blume
 Calamus heteroideus Blume
 Calamus hirsutus (Blume) Miq.
 Calamus holttumii Furtado
 Calamus hookerianus Becc.
 Calamus horrens Blume
 Calamus hosensis A.J.Hend.
 Calamus hukaungensis A.J.Hend.
 Calamus impressus A.J.Hend., Pitopang & Moh.Iqbal
 Calamus inermis T.Anderson
 Calamus ingens (J.Dransf.) W.J.Baker
 Calamus inops Becc. ex K.Heyne
 Calamus insignis Griff.
 Calamus insolitus A.J.Hend.
 Calamus insularis A.J.Hend.
 Calamus interruptus Becc.
 Calamus jacobsii W.J.Baker & J.Dransf.
 Calamus javensis Blume
 Calamus johanis A.J.Hend.
 Calamus johndransfieldii W.J.Baker
 Calamus johnsii W.J.Baker & J.Dransf.
 Calamus kampucheaensis A.J.Hend. & Hourt
 Calamus kandariensis Becc.
 Calamus karuensis Ridl.
 Calamus katikii W.J.Baker & J.Dransf.
 Calamus kebariensis Maturb., J.Dransf. & W.J.Baker
 Calamus kinabaluensis A.J.Hend.
 Calamus kingianus Becc.
 Calamus kjellbergii Furtado
 Calamus klossii Ridl.
 Calamus kontumensis A.J.Hend., N.K.Ban & N.Q.Dung
 Calamus koordersianus Becc.
 Calamus kostermansii W.J.Baker & J.Dransf.
 Calamus kubahensis A.J.Hend.
 Calamus kunstleri (Becc.) W.J.Baker
 Calamus lakshmanae Renuka
 Calamus lambirensis J.Dransf.
 Calamus lamprolepis (Becc.) W.J.Baker
 Calamus laoensis T.Evans, Sengdala, Viengkham, Thamm. & J.Dransf.
 Calamus lateralis A.J.Hend., N.K.Ban & N.Q.Dung
 Calamus latifolius Roxb.
 Calamus latus A.J.Hend.
 Calamus lauterbachii Becc.
 Calamus laxissimus Ridl.
 Calamus leiocaulis Becc. ex K.Heyne
 Calamus leloi J.Dransf.
 Calamus lengguanii A.J.Hend.
 Calamus leptopus Griff.
 Calamus leptospadix Griff.
 Calamus leptostachys Becc. ex K.Heyne
 Calamus lobatus A.J.Hend., Pitopang & Moh.Iqbal
 Calamus lobbianus Becc.
 Calamus loherianus (Becc.) W.J.Baker
 Calamus longibracteatus W.J.Baker
 Calamus longipes Griff.
 Calamus longipinna K.Schum. & Lauterb.
 Calamus longisetus Griff.
 Calamus longispatha Ridl.
 Calamus longiusculus A.J.Hend.
 Calamus lucysmithiae W.J.Baker & J.Dransf.
 Calamus macrochlamys Becc.
 Calamus macropterus Miq.
 Calamus macrorhynchus Burret
 Calamus macrosphaerion Becc.
 Calamus maculatus (J.Dransf.) W.J.Baker
 Calamus mahanandensis S.Mondal, S.K.Basu & M.Chowdhury
 Calamus maiadum J.Dransf.
 Calamus malawaliensis J.Dransf.
 Calamus manan Miq.
 Calamus manglaensis A.J.Hend. & N.Q.Dung
 Calamus manillensis (Mart.) H.Wendl.
 Calamus marginatus (Blume) Mart. ex Walp.
 Calamus maturbongsii W.J.Baker & J.Dransf.
 Calamus megaphyllus Becc.
 Calamus meghalayensis A.J.Hend.
 Calamus melanacanthos Mart.
 Calamus melanochaetes (Blume) Miq.
 Calamus melanochrous Burret
 Calamus melanoloma Mart.
 Calamus melanorhynchus Becc.
 Calamus metzianus Schltdl.
 Calamus micracanthus Griff.
 Calamus micranthus Blume
 Calamus microsphaerion Becc.
 Calamus minahassae Warb. ex Becc.
 Calamus minor A.J.Hend.
 Calamus minutus J.Dransf.
 Calamus mirabilis Mart.
 Calamus mitis Becc.
 Calamus modestus T.Evans & T.P.Anh
 Calamus mogeae J.Dransf.
 Calamus mollispinus (J.Dransf.) W.J.Baker
 Calamus moorei (J.Dransf.) W.J.Baker
 Calamus moorhousei Furtado
 Calamus moseleyanus Becc.
 Calamus moszkowskianus Becc.
 Calamus moti F.M.Bailey
 Calamus muelleri H.Wendl.
 Calamus multispicatus Burret
 Calamus muricatus Becc.
 Calamus myriacanthus Becc.
 Calamus myrianthus Becc.
 Calamus nagbettai R.R.Fernandez & Dey
 Calamus nambariensis Becc.
 Calamus nanduensis W.J.Baker & J.Dransf.
 Calamus nannostachys Burret
 Calamus nanodendron J.Dransf.
 Calamus nematospadix Becc.
 Calamus nicobaricus Becc.
 Calamus nielsenii J.Dransf.
 Calamus nitidus Mart.
 Calamus notabilis A.J.Hend.
 Calamus novae-georgii W.J.Baker & J.Dransf.
 Calamus nudus W.J.Baker & S.Venter
 Calamus nuichuaensis A.J.Hend., N.K.Ban & N.Q.Dung
 Calamus nuralievii A.J.Hend. & N.Q.Dung
 Calamus obiensis A.J.Hend.
 Calamus oblatus (J.Dransf.) W.J.Baker
 Calamus oblongus Reinw. ex Blume
 Calamus occidentalis Witono & J.Dransf.
 Calamus ochrolepis (Becc.) W.J.Baker
 Calamus ocreatus (A.J.Hend. & N.Q.Dung) W.J.Baker
 Calamus oligostachys T.Evans, Sengdala, Viengkham, Thamm. & J.Dransf.
 Calamus optimus Becc.
 Calamus oresbiopsis A.J.Hend.
 Calamus oresbius W.J.Baker & J.Dransf.
 Calamus ornatus Blume
 Calamus ovoideus Thwaites ex Trimen
 Calamus oxleyanus Teijsm. & Binn. ex Miq.
 Calamus oxleyoides A.J.Hend.
 Calamus oxycarpus Becc.
 Calamus oxycoccus W.J.Baker
 Calamus pachystemonus Thwaites
 Calamus padangensis Furtado
 Calamus pahangensis A.J.Hend.
 Calamus pandanosmus Furtado
 Calamus papuanus Becc.
 Calamus parutan Fernando
 Calamus parvulus A.J.Hend. & N.Q.Dung
 Calamus paspalanthus Becc.
 Calamus paulii J.Dransf.
 Calamus pedicellaris (Becc.) W.J.Baker
 Calamus pedicellatus Becc. ex K.Heyne
 Calamus penicillatus Roxb.
 Calamus perakensis Becc.
 Calamus peregrinus Furtado
 Calamus periacanthus (Miq.) Miq.
 Calamus pertenuis A.J.Hend. & Rustiami
 Calamus pholidostachys J.Dransf. & W.J.Baker
 Calamus pilosellus Becc.
 Calamus pilosissimus Becc.
 Calamus platyspathus Mart. ex Kunth
 Calamus plicatus Blume
 Calamus poensis Becc.
 Calamus pogonacanthus Becc. ex H.J.P.Winkl.
 Calamus pogonotium W.J.Baker
 Calamus poilanei Conrard
 Calamus politus (Fernando) W.J.Baker
 Calamus polycladus Burret
 Calamus posoanus Rustiami
 Calamus powlingii A.J.Hend.
 Calamus praetermissus J.Dransf.
 Calamus propinquus (Becc.) A.J.Hend.
 Calamus pseudoconcolor (J.Dransf.) W.J.Baker
 Calamus pseudomollis Becc.
 Calamus pseudotenuis Becc.
 Calamus pseudozebrinus Burret
 Calamus psilocladus J.Dransf.
 Calamus pycnocarpus (Furtado) J.Dransf.
 Calamus pygmaeus Becc.
 Calamus quangngaiensis A.J.Hend. & N.Q.Dung
 Calamus radiatus Thwaites
 Calamus radicalis H.Wendl. & Drude
 Calamus radulosus Becc.
 Calamus reinwardtii Mart.
 Calamus reticulatus Burret
 Calamus retroflexus J.Dransf. & W.J.Baker
 Calamus rhabdocladus Burret
 Calamus rheedei Griff.
 Calamus rhomboideus Blume
 Calamus rhytidomus Becc.
 Calamus ridleyanus Becc.
 Calamus robinsonianus Becc.
 Calamus rotang L.
 Calamus ruber Reinw. ex Mart.
 Calamus rudentum Lour.
 Calamus rugosus Becc.
 Calamus rumphii Blume
 Calamus ruptilis (Becc.) W.J.Baker
 Calamus ruptiloides A.J.Hend.
 Calamus ruvidus Becc.
 Calamus sabalensis J.Dransf.
 Calamus salicifolius Becc.
 Calamus saltuensis A.J.Hend.
 Calamus samian Becc.
 Calamus sandsii Rustiami
 Calamus sarawakensis Becc.
 Calamus sashae J.Dransf. & W.J.Baker
 Calamus scabridulus Becc.
 Calamus scabrispathus Becc.
 Calamus scapiger (Becc.) W.J.Baker
 Calamus schistoacanthus Blume
 Calamus schlechteri (Burret) W.J.Baker
 Calamus schlechterianus Becc.
 Calamus scipionum Lour.
 Calamus scleracanthus Becc. ex K.Heyne
 Calamus sedens J.Dransf.
 Calamus senalingensis J.Dransf.
 Calamus septimus A.J.Hend. & Rustiami
 Calamus seriatus A.J.Hend. & N.Q.Dung
 Calamus seropakensis A.J.Hend.
 Calamus serpentinus (J.Dransf.) W.J.Baker
 Calamus serrulatus Becc.
 Calamus sessiliflorus A.J.Hend. & Rustiami
 Calamus simplex Becc.
 Calamus siphonospathus Mart. ex Walp.
 Calamus smitinandii (J.Dransf.) A.J.Hend.
 Calamus sordidus J.Dransf.
 Calamus spanostachys W.J.Baker & J.Dransf.
 Calamus sparsiflorus (Becc.) W.J.Baker
 Calamus spectatissimus Furtado
 Calamus spiculifer J.Dransf. & W.J.Baker
 Calamus spinosus A.J.Hend., Pitopang & Moh.Iqbal
 Calamus spinulinervis Becc.
 Calamus spiralis A.J.Hend., N.K.Ban & N.Q.Dung
 Calamus suaveolens W.J.Baker & J.Dransf.
 Calamus subangulatus Miq.
 Calamus subsolanus A.J.Hend. & Rustiami
 Calamus sulawesiensis A.J.Hend.
 Calamus sumatranus (Becc.) A.J.Hend.
 Calamus superciliatus W.J.Baker & J.Dransf.
 Calamus susukensis A.J.Hend. & Rustiami
 Calamus symphysipus Mart. ex Walp.
 Calamus tadulakoensis A.J.Hend., Moh.Iqbal, Rusydi & Pitopang
 Calamus tambingensis A.J.Hend., Pitopang & Moh.Iqbal
 Calamus tapanensis A.J.Hend.
 Calamus temii T.Evans
 Calamus tenompokensis Furtado
 Calamus tenuis Roxb.
 Calamus tetradactyloides Burret
 Calamus tetradactylus Hance
 Calamus thwaitesii Becc.
 Calamus thysanolepis Hance
 Calamus timorensis Becc.
 Calamus trachycoleus Becc.
 Calamus trigynus A.J.Hend., Pitopang & Moh.Iqbal
 Calamus tumidus Furtado
 Calamus unifarius H.Wendl.
 Calamus unijugus (J.Dransf.) W.J.Baker
 Calamus ursinus (Becc.) W.J.Baker
 Calamus usitatus Blanco
 Calamus validus W.J.Baker
 Calamus vattayila Renuka
 Calamus velutinus A.J.Hend. & N.Q.Dung
 Calamus verticillaris Griff.
 Calamus vestitus Becc.
 Calamus vidalianus Becc.
 Calamus viminalis Willd.
 Calamus vinaceus A.J.Hend., Pitopang & Moh.Iqbal
 Calamus vinosus Becc.
 Calamus viridis A.J.Hend., Pitopang & Moh.Iqbal
 Calamus vitiensis Warb. ex Becc.
 Calamus walkeri Hance
 Calamus wanggaii W.J.Baker & J.Dransf.
 Calamus warayanus Adorador & Fernando
 Calamus warburgii K.Schum.
 Calamus wedaensis A.J.Hend.
 Calamus whitmorei J.Dransf.
 Calamus wightii Griff.
 Calamus womersleyi J.Dransf. & W.J.Baker
 Calamus wuliangshanensis San Y.Chen, K.L.Wang & S.J.Pei
 Calamus yentuensis A.J.Hend. & N.Q.Dung
 Calamus zebrinus Becc.
 Calamus zeylanicus Becc.
 Calamus zieckii Fernando
 Calamus zollingeri Becc.
 Calamus zonatus Becc.

Uses
The stems may be harvested for their cores, which are used for everything from canes to furniture.

References

Bibliography

 
 , in

External links

 
Arecaceae genera
Dioecious plants